The Million Dollar Bridge was a bascule bridge built in 1916 which carried traffic on Route 77 over the Fore River in Maine between Portland and South Portland.

Permits to construct the Million Dollar Bridge were issued by the Secretary of War in 1893. The bridge was designed in 1914 and opened to traffic in 1916. Originally owned by Cumberland County, the bridge was transferred to the Maine Department of Transportation in 1959.

In 1993, construction began on Casco Bay Bridge, a replacement for the Million Dollar Bridge. The Casco Bay Bridge is a higher bascule bridge, with an alignment just east of the Million Dollar Bridge. During construction of the new bridge, the Million Dollar Bridge was hit by the Liberian Tankship Julie N. on September 27, 1996, and emergency repairs were made. The Casco Bay Bridge opened in 1997.

References

External links

Bridges completed in 1916
Bascule bridges in the United States
Buildings and structures in South Portland, Maine
Bridges in Portland, Maine
Road bridges in Maine
Bridges in Cumberland County, Maine
Demolished bridges in the United States
1916 establishments in Maine
1998 disestablishments in Maine